Allendale, California may refer to:
 Allendale, Fremont, California
 Allendale, Oakland, California
 Allendale, Solano County, California
 Allendale, California, possibly one of the above, a community destroyed by nuclear war in Ray Bradbury's science fiction story "There Will Come Soft Rains"